Wojciech Weiss (4 May 1875 – 7 December 1950) was a prominent Polish painter and draughtsman of the Young Poland movement.

Weiss was born in Bukovina to a Polish family in exile of Stanisław Weiss and Maria Kopaczyńska. He gave up music training to study art at the Academy of Fine Arts in Kraków under Leon Wyczółkowski. Weiss originally painted historical or mythological paintings, but later switched to Expressionism after being profoundly influenced by Stanisław Przybyszewski. Weiss later became a member of the Vienna Secession. He was one of the first Polish Art Nouveau poster designers. Near the end of his life, he made several significant contributions to paintings of the Socialist realism in Poland.

External links

Short biography at Wojciech Weiss Foundation Museum  
Numerous Wojciech Weiss paintings
Wojciech Weiss links 
Extensive Essay and selection of paintings from Weiss 

1875 births
1950 deaths
19th-century Polish painters
19th-century Polish male artists
20th-century Polish painters
20th-century Polish male artists
Polish draughtsmen
Art Nouveau painters
Romanian people of Polish descent
People from Botoșani County
Polish male painters